Anita Yuen Wing Yee (born 4 September 1971) is a Hong Kong film and television actress.

Pageant career
At the age of 18, Yuen entered the Miss Hong Kong 1990 pageant. She was a heavy favorite to win the crown from the semifinal to final. During the semifinals on August 5, 1990, she won the Miss Photogenic award. She had a semifinal score of 485, placing 3rd overall. The finals were held on August 21, 1990. She eventually beat out another big favorite, Helen Yung who was 1st runner up and the winner of 2 other awards. Yuen later represented Hong Kong at the Miss Chinese International 1991 pageant, held on February 2, 1991. She took 1st runner up for Hong Kong. She also competed at the Miss Universe 1991 pageant in Las Vegas, Nevada. She failed to make the top 10 and was placed 60th.

Film career
Yuen is best known for her role as the female lead in Derek Yee's 1993 tear-jerker C'est la vie, mon chéri (1993).  She is also well-remembered in her cross-gender comic role opposite Leslie Cheung in He's a Woman, She's a Man (1994).  The two roles won for her the Hong Kong Academy Best Actress awards.  She also gave a powerful performance in, for instance, The Chinese Feast, co-starring together with Leslie Cheung. Apart from her role in a great many films, she has also acted in a number of Mainland-Taiwan television serials, such as Hua Mu Lan, opposite Vincent Zhao.

Personal life
Her husband is Hong Kong actor and singer Julian Cheung. In May 2006, Yuen announced that she was 3 months pregnant with their first child. Their son, Morton Cheung, was born on November 12, 2006. On June 23, 2007, Yuen was a guest on TVB's Be My Guest with host Stephen Chan revealing that she and Julian were secretly married in Shibuya City, Japan, back in 2001. Anita had finally revealed in early 2021 that after she gave birth to Morton, she and her husband Julian attempted to have a second child first through natural conception with desire for their son Morton to have a little brother or sister, however this attempt failed as Anita's natural increasing age played a large role in this barrier. Anita and Julian then agreed to try In vitro fertilisation using sperm extracted from Julian's collected preserved semen to impregnate Anita, but after multiple procedural attempts, the attempted pregnancy was unsuccessful and they eventually gave up on the attempt.

Filmography

Film

Television drama

Awards and nominations

References

External links
Official Sina Blog of Anita Yuen
Anita Yuen on Sina Weibo

Anita Yuen Wing Yee at the Hong Kong Cinemagic

1971 births
20th-century Hong Kong actresses
21st-century Hong Kong actresses
Hong Kong film actresses
Hong Kong television actresses
Living people
Miss Hong Kong winners
Miss Universe 1991 contestants
Australian people of Chinese descent
Australian people of Hong Kong descent